FC Flora, commonly known as Flora Tallinn, or simply as Flora, is a professional football club based in Tallinn, Estonia, that competes in the Meistriliiga, the top flight of Estonian football. The club's home ground is Lilleküla Stadium.

Formed in 1990, Flora were founding members of the Meistriliiga, and is one of two clubs which have never been relegated from the Estonian top division, along with Narva Trans. Flora is the first and only Estonian club to play in any full UEFA club competition, having competed in the 2021–22 UEFA Europa Conference League. Flora have won more trophies than any other club in Estonian football, with 33 titles; a record 14 Meistriliiga titles, eight Estonian Cups and a record 11 Estonian Supercups.

History

Early history (1990–2000)
Flora was founded on 10 March 1990 by Aivar Pohlak as an effort to revive Estonian football during the dissolution of the Soviet Union. The team was mainly based on players from Lõvid youth team. Flora finished their first season in last place and were relegated. The situation changed after the formation of the Meistriliiga in 1992. After 52 years of the Soviet occupation (Estonian SSR), Estonian clubs could once again play for the Estonian League Championship title. Flora finished the inaugural season of the Meistriliiga in fourth place. After the first season, the league was reformed to run from Autumn to Spring. Flora finished the 1992–93 season as runners-up. In 1993, Roman Ubakivi was appointed as manager. One round before the end of the 1993–94 season, Tevalte, who led the Meistriliiga table at the time, was controversially disqualified over allegations of match fixing. The season ended with Flora and Norma both on equal 36 points. Flora won the championship play-off match 5–2 and was awarded their first league title. The club made their European debut in the 1994–95 UEFA Cup, losing to Odense 0–6 on aggregate in the preliminary round. Flora managed to defend the league title in the 1994–95 season and won the 1994–95 Estonian Cup, defeating Lantana-Marlekor 2–0 in the final.

In January 1996, Teitur Thordarson replaced Ubakivi as manager. Disappointing start in the 1995–96 season left the team in second place. Flora finished the 1996–97 season as runners-up once again. In the 1997–98 season, the club won their first league title under Thordarson. Subsequently, the league format was changed and Flora managed win another title in the same calendar year. Flora made their debut in the UEFA Champions League for the first time in the 1998–99 season, narrowly losing to Steaua București 4–5 on aggregate in the first qualifying round. The club added another Estonian Cup trophy after defeating Lantana 3–2 in the finals. Since 1999, Meistriliiga adopted the current league format with the season running from Spring to Autumn within a single calendar year. The 1999 season was unsuccessful as Flora placed third. In 2000, Tarmo Rüütli was appointed as manager. Under Rüütli, Flora finished the 2000 season as runners-up, behind Levadia who won the title without a single loss.

New stadium and a new era (2001–2009)

In 2001, a new era began for Flora as the club moved to the new Lilleküla Stadium and Rüütli was replaced by Arno Pijpers. Under Pijpers, Flora won three consecutive Meistriliiga titles in 2001, 2002 and 2003. In the 2003 season, Flora won the league without losing a single league match, extending their unbeaten run from the previous season to 37, while Tor Henning Hamre scored a record 39 goals in a season. Pijpers left Flora in September 2004, before the end of the 2004 season, and was replaced by Janno Kivisild. The team failed to defend the league title for another season, finishing in third place.

The 2005 season was unsuccessful as Flora placed fourth, 26 points behind the league champions TVMK. This was the first time Flora didn't win a Meistriliiga medal since 1992. After the disappointing season, Kivisild was replaced by Pasi Rautiainen. In the 2006–07 UEFA Cup, Flora defeated Lyn Oslo 1–1 on aggregate on away goals in the first qualifying round, before losing to Brøndby 0–4 on aggregate in the second qualifying round. The club finished the 2006 season in third place and placed second in the 2007 season. In 2007, Flora also suffered their biggest margin of defeat in the Meistriliiga thus far, losing 0–6 to TVMK. Flora finished the 2008 season as runners-up, behind Levadia once again, despite amassing 91 points and scoring 113 goals. Tarmo Rüütli returned to Flora for the 2009 season, but failed to lead the club to winning the league, placing fourth. Flora were more successful in the Estonian Cup, winning the trophy in 2008 and 2009.

Recent history (2010–present)
In 2010, Rüütli was replaced by the former Flora player and Estonia national team record cap holder Martin Reim. Under Reim, rejuvenated Flora ended the reign of Levadia who had won the four previous Meistriliiga titles and won the league in the 2010 season. Flora successfully defended their title in the 2011 season and won the 2010–11 Estonian Cup, defeating Narva Trans 2–0 in the final. Flora finished the 2012 season in third place, behind the champions Nõmme Kalju and Levadia. After the season, Reim left the club and was replaced Marko Lelov in December 2012. Lelov won the 2012–13 Estonian Cup, but was sacked in July 2013 after disappointing results in the league. He was replaced by Norbert Hurt, initially as a caretaker, with position being made permanent later. Flora finished the 2013 season in fourth place and placed third in 2014.

In 2015, Flora celebrated their 25th anniversary by winning their 10th league title in the 34th round of the season. The club also won the 2015–16 Estonian Cup, defeating Sillamäe Kalev 3–0 in extra time in the final. In May 2016, Aivar Pohlak resigned from the club's presidency and was succeeded by his son Pelle Pohlak. In the first qualifying round of the 2016–17 UEFA Champions League, Flora lost to Lincoln Red Imps 2–3 on aggregate, after which Hurt resigned and was replaced by Argo Arbeiter. Flora finished the disappointing 2016 season in fourth place. Arbeiter was sacked and in January 2017, Arno Pijpers to take over as manager. In the 2017 season, Flora won their 11th Meistriliiga title. In December 2017, it was announced that Pijpers will not continue as manager.

Jürgen Henn was appointed in Pijpers' place in January 2018. Under Henn, Flora won the 2019 Meistriliiga and advanced through the first qualifying round of Europa League, beating Radnički Niš 4–2 on aggregate. Flora faced Eintracht Frankfurt in the second round. The first leg was held in Tallinn and brought a record 8,537 people onto the stands, as Flora narrowly lost 1–2 with Mihkel Ainsalu scoring for Flora. The second round was played in Frankfurt in front of 48,000 people, where Flora lost 1–2. Led by Jürgen Henn, Flora won the 2020 Meistriliiga title and advanced to UEFA Europa League qualifying play-offs, where they lost 1–3 to Dinamo Zagreb on 1 October 2020.

Flora became the first Estonian side to advance to a UEFA club competitions group stage when they beat Shamrock Rovers 5–2 on aggregate to qualify for the 2021–22 UEFA Europa Conference League on 26 August 2021, where they were drawn into group B against Gent of Belgium, Partizan of Serbia and Anorthosis Famagusta of Cyprus. The 2–2 draw away against Anorthosis was the first ever point picked up by an Estonian side in UEFA group stage history, with Rauno Sappinen scoring both goals as Flora came from 2–0 down to earn a point in Cyprus. On match day 5, Flora made more history by beating Partizan 1–0 in Tallinn, thanks to a goal from Martin Miller. This result meant that they became the first ever Estonian side to win a game in a UEFA group stage.

After finishing the 2021 Meistriliiga season as runners-up, FC Flora won their 14th Estonian championship title in the 2022 season, earning 97 points and thus repeating Levadia's 2009 record of most points in a season.

Crest and colours
Flora crest features the Greco-Roman goddess Flora, after whom the club is named. The club's colours are green and white, symbolizing growth, purity and honesty.

Kit manufacturers and shirt sponsors

Stadium

The club's home ground is the 14,336-seat Lilleküla Stadium. Opened in 2001 and expanded from 2016 to 2018, it is the largest football stadium in Estonia. The Lilleküla Football Complex also includes two grass surface pitches, two artificial turf pitches and an indoor hall. Lilleküla Stadium is located at Jalgpalli 21, Kesklinn, Tallinn.

Flora use Sportland Arena artificial turf, located next to Lilleküla Stadium, for training and home matches during winter and early spring months.

Players

First-team squad

 (on loan from Újpest)

For season transfers, see transfers summer 2022 and transfers winter 2022–23.

Out on loan

Reserves and academy

Retired numbers

12 – Club supporters (the 12th Man)

Club officials

Coaching staff

Managerial history

Honours

Domestic

League
 Meistriliiga
 Winners (14): 1993–94, 1994–95, 1997–98, 1998, 2001, 2002, 2003, 2010, 2011, 2015, 2017, 2019, 2020, 2022

Cups
 Estonian Cup
 Winners (8): 1994–95, 1997–98, 2007–08, 2008–09, 2010–11, 2012–13, 2015–16, 2019–20
 Estonian Supercup
Winners (11): 1998, 2002, 2003, 2004, 2009, 2011, 2012, 2014, 2016, 2020, 2021

Regional
 Livonia Cup
 Winners (3): 2011, 2018, 2023

Seasons and statistics

Seasons

Europe

References

External links

  
 Flora at Estonian Football Association
 Flora at UEFA.com

 
1990 establishments in Estonia
Association football clubs established in 1990
Football clubs in Tallinn
Meistriliiga clubs